Aethes heleniana is a species of moth of the family Tortricidae. It was described by Razowski in 1997. It is found in the United States, where it has been recorded from Maryland and Wisconsin.

The larvae feed on Helenium autumnale.

References

heleniana
Moths described in 1997
Moths of North America
Taxa named by Józef Razowski